Earl Jeffrey Wentworth (born November 20, 1940), is a  Republican former member of the Texas Senate from San Antonio. He represented District 25 in the upper legislative chamber from January 1997 to January 2013. In addition, from 1993 to 1997, he represented District 26, having been initially elected to the state senate in 1992 to succeed fellow Republican Cyndi Taylor Krier, when she became the county judge of Bexar County.  District 25 included northern portions of Bexar County, all of Comal, Guadalupe, Hays, and Kendall counties, and a part of southern Travis County.

From 1988 to 1993, Wentworth was a member of the Texas House of Representatives from District 123. He won a special election on May 7, 1988, called when the Republican Representative Kae T. Patrick of San Antonio resigned in his fourth term.

In 2010, Wentworth wrote to Chairman Ron Blatchley (Chairman of the Texas State University System Board of Regents) a scathing letter from a sitting State Senator expressing his unhappiness with the Texas State University System Board of Regents decision to appoint State Rep. Brian McCall as the Chancellor of the Texas State University System over him.  In the letter Wentworth expresses a strong disagreement with Mr. McCall's appointment and repeatedly states that he authored the bill that changed the name of Southwest Texas State University (SWT) to Texas State University-San Marcos (TSU-SM) - a very unpopular bill among the vast majority of SWT alumni with suggestions throughout he expected this appointment in part due to carrying this legislation, having it killed in one sub-committee, re-introducing the bill in a rush before another unrelated sub-committee to finally get it passed.  Opposition to the bill was not limited to SWT alumni but also included dozens and dozens of Texas Southern University (TSU) faculty, students and alumni aligned with SWT alumni.

In 2012, Wentworth was defeated in his bid for re-nomination. In the Republican primary runoff held on July 31, he lost to Tea Party candidate Donna Campbell, who amassed 45,292 votes (66.2 percent) to Wentworth's 23,168 (33.8 percent).

Wentworth and his wife Karla, a licensed professional interior designer, have two sons, Jason and Matthew Wentworth. After his term in the state Senate, Wentworth was appointed to the position of Precinct 3 justice of the peace by the Bexar County Commission.

Election history

Senate election history of Wentworth.

2012

2010

2006

2002

2000

1996

1994

1992

References
https://static.texastribune.org/media/documents/Wentworths_Letter.pdf

External links
Senate of Texas - Senator Jeff Wentworth official TX Senate website 
Project Vote Smart - Senator Earl Jeffrey 'Jeff' Wentworth (TX) profile
Follow the Money - Jeff Wentworth
2006 2004 2002 2000 campaign contributions

1940 births
Living people
Presidents pro tempore of the Texas Senate
Republican Party Texas state senators
Republican Party members of the Texas House of Representatives
Texas justices of the peace
People from Mercedes, Texas
People from San Antonio
Texas A&M University alumni
Texas Tech University School of Law alumni
Texas lawyers
21st-century American politicians